Carlo Nocella (25 November 1826 – 22 July 1908) was an Italian cardinal. He was Secretary of the Sacred Consistorial Congregation (1892–1899), Latin Patriarch of Antioch (1899–1901), and Latin Patriarch of Constantinople (1901–1903).

Biography
Nocella was born in Rome and studied at the Pontifical Roman Athenaeum S. Apollinare, from where he obtained a doctorate in canon and civil law. Ordained a priest on 2 September 1849, he joined the faculty of the Pontifical Roman Athenaeum S. Apollinare and later became Secretary of Latin Letters, canon of the Liberian Basilica and of St. Peter's Basilica, and protonotary apostolic de numero participantium. He was named Secretary of Briefs to the Princes on 5 December 1884, and Secretary of the Sacred Consistorial Congregation on 21 March 1892.

On 22 June 1899, Nocella was appointed Latin Patriarch of Antioch by Pope Leo XIII. He received his episcopal consecration on the following 16 July from Cardinal Mariano Rampolla, with Archbishops Felice Maria de Neckere and Casimiro Gennari, at the altar of the Chair of Peter in St. Peter's Basilica. He was transferred to the Latin Patriarchate of Constantinople on 18 April 1901.

Leo XIII created him Cardinal Priest of S. Callisto in the consistory of 22 June 1903. He participated in the 1903 papal conclave, which elected Pope Pius X. Nocella died in Rome, aged 81; he is buried in Campo Verano cemetery.

References

1826 births
1908 deaths
19th-century Italian Roman Catholic archbishops
20th-century Italian Roman Catholic archbishops
Clergy from Rome
20th-century Italian cardinals
Cardinals created by Pope Leo XIII
Latin Patriarchs of Antioch
Latin Patriarchs of Constantinople
Members of the Sacred Consistorial Congregation